Ling Shao is a Chinese computer scientist and a researcher in artificial intelligence. He is the Founding CEO and Chief Scientist of the Inception Institute of Artificial Intelligence (IIAI), Abu Dhabi, the United Arab Emirates. He was also the initiator of the world's first AI universityMohamed bin Zayed University of Artificial Intelligence, for which he served as its Founding Provost and Executive Vice President from 2019 to 2021.

Ling Shao is a Fellow of the IEEE, the IAPR, the IET and the British Computer Society.

Education 
Ling Shao received his B.Eng. degree in Electronic and Information Engineering from the University of Science and Technology of China (USTC) in 2001. He received his M.Sc. and Ph.D. (D.Phil.) degrees from the University of Oxford in 2002 and 2005, respectively.

Career and Research 
After finishing his PhD, Ling Shao worked as a Senior Scientist at Philips Research in Eindhoven, the Netherlands from 2005 to 2009. Between 2009 and 2017, he was a senior academic with several British universities, including Senior Lecturer at the University of Sheffield and Chair Professor at the University of East Anglia.

Shao's research interests include computer vision, machine learning, medical image analysis and vision and language.

References 

Living people
Computer vision researchers

Year of birth missing (living people)